Red Cove was a settlement which has been depopulated since 1968. It was located east of Burgeo.

See also
List of communities in Newfoundland and Labrador
List of people of Newfoundland and Labrador

Ghost towns in Newfoundland and Labrador